Charly Moussono (born 15 November 1984) is a footballer who plays for Pretoria University F.C. in the South African National First Division. Although Cameroonian by birth, he has represented Gabon and Cameroon at international level. Despite representing Gabon at the Africa Cup of Nations in 2012, FIFA later found him to be ineligible to represent Gabon at international level.

In 2011, Moussono played several games for Gabon and was also included in a high-profile friendly game against Brazil. He was later named in the Gabon squad for the 2012 Africa Cup of Nations. He played in all four games that Gabon participated in.

On 3 June 2012, he represented Gabon in a 0-0 draw with Niger in a FIFA sanctioned World Cup qualifying match.  In December 2012, FIFA announced that Moussono was not an eligible player for Gabon as he had represented Cameroon in the 2006 FIFA Beach Soccer World Cup competition. Niger were awarded a 3–0 victory over Gabon.

References 

1984 births
Living people
Gabonese footballers
Gabon international footballers
Association football defenders
2012 Africa Cup of Nations players
Olympic footballers of Gabon
Footballers at the 2012 Summer Olympics
21st-century Gabonese people
Cameroonian footballers
2011 African Nations Championship players
Gabon A' international footballers
Cameroonian expatriate footballers
Gabonese expatriate footballers
Cameroonian expatriate sportspeople in South Africa
Gabonese expatriate sportspeople in South Africa
Expatriate soccer players in South Africa